Minuscule 140 (in the Gregory-Aland numbering), ε 202 (Soden), is a Greek minuscule manuscript of the New Testament, on parchment leaves. Palaeographically it has been assigned to the 13th century. The codex has complex contents, with full marginalia.

Description 

The codex contains a complete text of the four Gospels on 408 parchment leaves (partly on paper) (size ). The text is written in two columns per page, 22 lines per page.

There is also another division according to the smaller Ammonian Sections (in Mark 234 sections – the last numbered section in 16:9), with references to the Eusebian Canons.

It contains the Eusebian Canon tables at the beginning and pictures.

Text 

The Greek text of the codex is a representative of the Byzantine text-type. Hermann von Soden classified it to the textual family Kx. Aland placed it in Category V.
According to the Claremont Profile Method it represents Kx in Luke 1 and Luke 20. In Luke 10 no profile was made.

Textually it is close to minuscule 80. In Luke 1:64 it has a textual variant that supports the Complutensian reading.

History 

The manuscript was given by the Queen of Cyprus to pope Innocent VII (1404-1406).

It was examined by Birch (about 1782), Scholz, and Franz Delitzsch. C. R. Gregory saw the manuscript in 1886.

It is currently housed at the Vatican Library (Vat. gr. 1158), at Rome.

See also 
 List of New Testament minuscules
 Biblical manuscript
 Textual criticism

References

Further reading 

 Franz Delitzsch, Fortgesetzte Studien zur Entstehungsgeschichte der camplutensziehen  Polyglotte (Leipzig 1886), pp. 30–35.

Greek New Testament minuscules
13th-century biblical manuscripts
Manuscripts of the Vatican Library